The Seven Sons of National Defence are technically the seven Chinese national public research universities affiliated with and funded by the Ministry of Industry and Information Technology of China. They are widely believed to have close scientific research partnerships and projects with the People’s Liberation Army.

Universities 
The universities of the Seven Sons of National Defence include:
 Beihang University in Haidian, Beijing
 Beijing Institute of Technology in Haidian, Beijing
 Harbin Engineering University in Harbin, Heilongjiang
 Harbin Institute of Technology in Harbin, Heilongjiang
 Nanjing University of Aeronautics and Astronautics in Nanjing, Jiangsu
 Nanjing University of Science and Technology in Nanjing, Jiangsu
 Northwestern Polytechnical University in Xi'an, Shaanxi

Overview
Three quarters of university graduates recruited by defense related state-owned enterprises in China come from the Seven Sons. The Seven Sons devote at least half of their research budgets to military products.

According to the Hoover Institution, the Seven Sons "operate as prime pathways for harvesting US research and diverting it to military applications."

The Seven Sons are all supervised by the Ministry of Industry and Information Technology.

In 2020, the United States government banned graduate students from the Seven Sons from entering the United States.

See also
 Seven Sisters (colleges)
 C9 League
 Excellence League
 Project 985

References

Colloquial terms for groups of universities and colleges